Huyi District, formerly known as Hu County or Huxian (written as / before 1964,  (same for both ways of writing)), is one of 11 urban districts of the prefecture-level city of Xi'an, the capital of Shaanxi Province, Northwest China. The district was approved to establish from the former Hu County by the Chinese State Council on November 24, 2016. As of 2018, its population was 558,600. The district borders the prefecture-level cities of Xianyang to the north and Ankang to the south and Chang'an District to the east.

Towards its south the district is bordered by the Qin Mountains and to the north by the Weihe River. Thirty-six rivers run through the area, making the land very fertile. Fifty-five acres of land are arable and 52.4 acres of land are covered by forests. The region has an abundance of minerals such as gold, silver, copper, iron, limestone and marble.

In 2010 GDP reached 100 billion Yuan (about US$2000 per capita).

Climate 

The district enjoys a warm tropical climate, free of extreme temperatures, with an average temperature of around 13.3 degrees Celsius (55 °F). The most pleasant months are in spring between March and May and September to November. The winters are cold but not excessively so, with an average temperature of -1 Celsius (30 °F) in January. The summers are warm and dry with most of the precipitation coming in the autumn.

Administrative divisions
As 2020, Huyi District is divided to 8 subdistricts and 6 towns.
Subdistricts

Towns

Economy 

This district is one of the main sources of Aggregata.

Herbs 
There are 340 kinds of medicinal herbs that grow wild in the area including Iris, Aggregata, Bupleurum, Tianma, Honeysuckle, Fritillaria, and Schisandra.

Demographics

The district has a male population of 303,400 and female population of 274,600 (1.1 male:1 female). The majority of the district's population is rural at 477,400, while the urban population is 100,600  (roughly 86.45% and 16.55% respectively). The population density is 477 people per square kilometer. Population density in urban areas can reach as high as 3400 per square kilometer, and can be as low as 11 per square kilometer in rural areas. Han make up 99.88% of the population, although 21 other ethnic groups also live there.

Transport
Xi'an–Huyi railway (operated by Xi'an Rail Transit Group since November 2022): Huxian station
Xi'an–Chengdu high-speed railway (operated by China Railway Xi'an Group): Huyi railway station

Tourism
Tourist attractions

Huyi district is famous for a variety of tourist attractions. Tourists can enjoy the landscape of this region, especially in two national parks—Taiping National Forest Park and Zhuque National Forest Park, which offer a great view of mountains and waterfalls. It is also the home to two famous temples: Caotang Temple and Chongyang Palace, where Wang Chongyang, founder of Quanzhen School, practiced Taoism and where he was buried. It is said that great ancient Chinese poets such as Du Fu, Cen Shen, Su Shi, and Cheng Hao visited Meibei Lake, which lies to the west of the downtown area of Huyi District.

References

External links

Districts of Xi'an